is the fourth story arc of the Japanese manga series JoJo's Bizarre Adventure, written and illustrated by Hirohiko Araki. It was serialized in Shueisha's Weekly Shōnen Jump for a little more than 3 years, from May 4, 1992, to December 4, 1995, with the 174 chapters collected into eighteen tankōbon volumes. In its original publication, it was titled . It was preceded by Stardust Crusaders and followed by Golden Wind.

This part introduces the Stand Arrow, which causes anyone pierced by it to develop a Stand if they are mentally strong enough. The Arrow was retroactively revealed to be the source of DIO's stand as well as the Joestar family's stands. The arc was adapted into an anime television series by David Production, JoJo's Bizarre Adventure: Diamond Is Unbreakable, that began in April 2016. A live-action film adaptation by Toho and Warner Bros. titled JoJo's Bizarre Adventure: Diamond Is Unbreakable Chapter I was released on August 4, 2017. Viz Media released the manga in English in a nine-volume compiled format from 2019 to 2021.

Plot
He bumps into a freshman named Koichi Hirose before the two encounter the youth Jotaro is looking for: A highschool student named Josuke Higashikata, whose Stand Crazy Diamond allows him to manipulate matter in ways that include repairing and healing. Fighting Josuke after inadvertently insulting his pompadour, Jotaro explains the nature of Stands and that one is used by a death row inmate named Anjuro "Angelo" Katagiri escaped to Morioh. Josuke unknowingly makes an enemy of Angelo, who murders his grandfather before Josuke uses his power to fuse Angelo into a rock. But Angelo uses his final moments of consciousness to reveal someone hit him with an Arrow that gave him his Stand, Jotaro learning that an actual artifact was possessed by Dio's forces. Josuke and Koichi eventually come across the culprit, Keicho Nijimura, who inflicts Koichi with the Arrow while his younger brother Okuyasu holds Josuke off. Josuke defeats Okuyasu and heals Koichi with Crazy Diamond, with Koichi developing a Stand called Echoes. After Keicho is defeated with his reason of creating Stand users to create someone able to mercy kill his father, a mutated subordinate of Dio's, Keicho is killed by Stand Red Hot Chili Pepper, which takes the Bow and Arrow. Okuyasu then joins Josuke's group to avenge his brother, encountering several other Stand users Keicho created before they eventually find and defeat Akira Otoishi, Red Hot Chili Pepper's user, as Joseph arrives in Morioh. The Bow and Arrow are taken into Jotaro's custody and all seems to be over for the moment. 

Soon afterward, after Josuke tries spending time with Joseph as they find a baby with an invisibility stand, the group encounters other Stand users such as eccentric manga artist Rohan Kishibe, middle schooler Shigekiyo "Shigechi" Yangu, and a beautician named Aya Tsuji. Koichi and Rohan later meet the ghosts of Reimi Sugimoto and her dog Arnold after stumbling into the mysterious Ghost Alley, learning of a serial killer who has been lurking in Morioh for years. The murderer is a handsome office worker named Yoshikage Kira, who seeks to satisfy his murderous hand fetish obsession while living a peaceful, quiet life by using the destructive ability of his Stand Killer Queen to erase any evidence of his crimes. But his prompted murder of Shigechi ends up exposing him during a brief battle with Jotaro and Koichi that left him injured as Josuke and Okuyasu arrive. Kira escapes and forces Aya to use her Stand to swap identities with a man Kosaku Kawajiri, killing them both while assuming Kosaku's life. Kira's father Yoshihiro, a ghost who uses his Stand to live on in a photo, uses a Bow and Arrow he received years ago from Enya Geil to create an army of Stand users to protect his son, including a dying cat that reincarnated as a Stand-plant hybrid named Stray Cat which Kira took as a pet.

Kosaku's son Hayato Kawajiri begins to suspect his father's imposter and confronts Kira, only to get murdered with Kira panicking before receiving a new ability after pierced by Yoshihiro's Arrow a second time that allows him to revive Hayato. The following morning, Hayato learns Kira inflicted him with Killer Queen's new ability Bites the Dust, which destroys whoever Hayato reveals Kira's identity to while rewinding time back an hour with the victim's fate fixed. After Rohan died in one loop and Josuke's group the next, Hayato realizes he needs to force Kira into canceling Bites the Dust before the others are killed with their deaths made permanent. Hayato exploits the knowledge he gained from the time loop to wake Josuke up early and arrange for him to overhear Kira blowing his cover. Kira is forced to use Killer Queen to defend himself, which cancels Bites the Dust just in time to save Josuke and his allies.

Josuke engages Kira in a pitched battle, Okuyasu seemingly killed as Josuke and Hayato take refuge in a house when Kira combines his Stand's powers with Stray Cat to create invisible projectile bombs. Kira plants Yoshihiro's photo into Hayato's pocket to track Josuke, only to be tricked into destroying his father before Okuyasu appears in the nick of time to swipe Stray Cat and further disadvantage Kira. As Jotaro, Koichi, and Rohan arrive with emergency workers responding to the explosions, Kira attempts to activate Bites the Dust on a nearby paramedic in a last ditch attempt to avert his defeat. But he is stopped by Jotaro with assistance from Koichi, knocked into the path of an arriving ambulance that accidentally crushes his skull. Kira's ghost ends up in Ghost Alley and is confronted by Reimi, who gets him dragged off into an unknown fate by spectral hands. Her mission accomplished, Reimi gives the group her final farewells and moves on to the afterlife. The next day, Josuke bids farewell to Jotaro and Joseph, who leave Morioh as the summer of 1999 draws to a close.

Characters

 Josuke Higashikata is the illegitimate son of Joseph Joestar. He is a freshman who lives in the town of Morioh with his mother and grandfather. His Stand is Crazy Diamond, which can not only punch rapidly, but also restore objects to their original state or rearrange their structure, allowing him to heal injuries, erase written documents, or revert complex structures to their raw components. However, Crazy Diamond has no effect when used on Josuke himself. Despite normally being kind and friendly, Josuke becomes especially enraged if anyone insults his pompadour hairstyle, which he adopted after a delinquent with the hairstyle saved him and his mother during a blizzard. This is demonstrated for the first time, after he punches an upperclassman, and incorrectly heals his face for insulting his hair.
 Koichi Hirose is Josuke's and Okuyasu's best friend and is also a freshman in high school, but appears as a short boy. His Stand is Echoes, which has three distinct "ACTs". ACT1 can create messages and attach them to a person by touching them, which results in the message repeatedly played in the victim's head (e.g. attaching the phrase "Believe in me" causes the message to be audibly spoken in Koichi's mother's head), ACT2 has a similar ability but instead can attach onomatopoeia onto objects, causing the effect of the onomatopoeia to activate when touched (e.g. attaching "sizzle" to a stair railing causes it to burn the person when touched), while ACT3 loses the former abilities (but can still recall previous ACTs) and sacrifices its long range, it gains the ability "3-Freeze", which dramatically increases the weight of a target and thereby making it unable to move. Koichi gains access to each ACT as he grows throughout the story, ultimately gaining ACT3 in the first battle with Kira.
 Okuyasu Nijimura is one of the two Nijimura brothers who became friends with Josuke Higashikata and Koichi Hirose after encountering a Stand user who murdered his brother. His Stand is The Hand, which can erase whatever it swipes with its right hand and can even be used to erase space, drawing objects closer to Okuyasu. Though the ability is incredibly versatile and powerful, Okuyasu's subpar intelligence prevents him from using it to its fullest potential.
 Jotaro Kujo is an aspiring marine biologist who travels to Morioh to find his grandfather's illegitimate son, Josuke Higashikata, who is technically Jotaro's uncle despite Jotaro being older than him, as well as investigate the crimes of a Stand user. His Stand is Star Platinum, which compensates for its short range with incredible strength, speed, and precision, as well as the ability Star Platinum: The World, which lets Jotaro temporarily stop the flow of time.
 Joseph Joestar is Josuke's father and Jotaro's grandfather. His Stand is Hermit Purple, which manifests in the form of multipurpose thorny purple vines that allow him to divine information through electrical equipment or be utilized as ropes. Now in his late 70's, Joseph is incredibly feeble and senile.
 Rohan Kishibe is a famous manga artist who recently moved into a house in Morioh. His Stand Heaven's Door, allows him to temporarily turn a person into a book, with all of their memories written down akin to a novel. Rohan can read the memories, learn their weaknesses and secrets, as well as write down commands that they must follow (usually writing that enemies cannot attack him). The power typically activates when the target sees Rohan's drawn artwork, but can also activate if Rohan draws something in the air with his finger. Rohan also stars in his own spin-off one-shot series by Araki called Thus Spoke Kishibe Rohan.
 Keicho Nijimura is Okuyasu's elder brother who caused the outbreak of Stand users in Morioh to create one whose Stand can end the suffering of their father after he was mutated by Dio Brando into a monstrous, handicapped being with rapid regeneration. Keicho was later killed by Akira Otoishi when saving his brother from an attack by the guitarist's stand. Keicho's Stand Bad Company is an army of toy soldiers.
 Anjuro Katagiri, also known as "Angelo", is a depraved serial killer with an IQ of 160. Originally on death row for various acts of murder and sexual assault, including staging a post-mortem ransom for a young boy, Angelo is made a Stand User by Keicho and uses his water-based Stand Aqua Necklace to escape captivity and resume his killing spree in Morioh before ultimately confronting Josuke, murdering the youth's grandfather before being fused by Crazy Diamond's powers into a stone that becomes Morioh's tourist attraction Angelo Rock.
Yukako Yamagishi is a high school student who develops an obsessive crush on Koichi. She kidnaps him and tries to form him into a "better man" by taking drastic measures to improve his grades. Koichi defends himself with the help of Echoes ACT2 and Yukako instead decides to admire Koichi from afar. However she soon sinks into depression and learns of a beauty salon named Cinderella from Joseph Joestar, which she uses to help rekindle her relationship with Koichi. Afterwards, she and Koichi become a couple. Her Stand is Love Deluxe, which is bound to her hair, allowing her grow her hair to long lengths to freely manipulate it.
Aya Tsuji is the owner of the Cinderella Salon, a beauty clinic in Morioh. She changes people's appearance and fate using her stand, Cinderella. 
 Akira Otoishi is an aspiring rock star guitarist. His Stand is Red Hot Chili Pepper, which draws its powers from electricity and can travel through various electrical outlets. He acquired his Stand after being shot with the Arrow by Keicho Nijimura.
 Yoshikage Kira is a hand-obsessed, mild-mannered serial killer who has been murdering women for more than 15 years. His Stand, Killer Queen, has the ability to create a bomb out of whatever it touches—including living people—allowing him to eliminate any evidence of his crimes. Kira has access to three bombs—the standard "Primary Bomb", a mobile heat-seeking "Secondary Bomb" known as Sheer Heart Attack, and a time-looping "Tertiary Bomb" known as Bites the Dust.
 Yoshihiro Kira is the ghost of Kira's father whose Stand Atom Heart Father allows him to remain among the living to protect Kira from within a photograph. Having acquired a Bow and Arrow from Enya prior to moving to Morioh, Yoshihiro uses the arrow to create Stand users in an attempt to keep Josuke's group away from Kira.
Mikitaka Hazekura is a strange individual who claims that he is an alien. He befriends Josuke and Okuyasu, and occasionally helps them out. Mikitaka uses the ability Earth Wind and Fire, allowing him to shapeshift into inanimate objects. It's ambiguous whether or not Mikitaka is actually an alien, or a normal human- additionally, it is unclear whether or not Earth Wind and Fire is a Stand or a similar ability.
 Tama is a British shorthair that was struck by the arrow, then wandered into the Kawajiri household, and was accidentally killed by a broken glass bottle during Shinobu's attempt to chase him out. After his death, he was reborn as a hybrid of cat and plant due to the awakening of his stand, Stray Cat, that, along with reviving Tama, has the ability to create bubbles of air to shoot at enemies, which Yoshikage Kira exploits later on to create bubble bombs.
 Reimi Sugimoto is Yoshikage Kira's first victim. She was killed 15 years before the happenings of the manga, and waited as a ghost for someone whom she could warn about her killer.
 Kosaku Kawajiri is an average salaryman working as an employee at S-Corp. He is Shinobu Kawajiri's wife, and the father of Hayato Kawajiri. He, according to his wife, is extremely boring, and is shown to be very irresponsible with money, as he is in debt to his landlord on a house he cannot afford, bought an expensive car, and still has to pay for Hayato's college tuition. He is killed by Yoshikage Kira at the Cinderella Salon, who then proceeded to steal his identity, and integrate himself into his family.
 Shinobu Kawajiri is the wife of Kosaku Kawajiri, and Hayato's mother. After Yoshikage Kira killed Kosaku and stole his identity, Yoshikage Kira began treating Shinobu better than Kosaku did originally, renewing Shinobu's love for her husband, who, unbeknownst to her, and for a time, Hayato, was not in fact her husband.
 Hayato Kawajiri is a shy and intelligent schoolboy who realized his father Kosaku Kawajiri was murdered by Kira when the killer assumed his identity. Though Kira decided to use the boy as a means to kill Josuke's group, Hayato ended up being the killer's downfall. Hayato does not have a Stand of his own, but he winds up being the host of Killer Queen: Bites the Dust, resulting in anyone who tries to interrogate Hayato about Kira's current whereabouts spontaneously exploding, followed by time rewinding an hour.
 Tonio Trussardi is a talented Italian chief who runs a restaurant called "Trattoria Trussardi". He first encounters Josuke and Okuyasu when they are paying a visit to the grave of Keicho. His Stand is called Pearl Jam, which allows to cure, heal and strengthen a person, though it destroys whatever organ its healing first, giving off a gruesome impression. This Stand is different from the other Stands as it is born from Tonio's zeal to perfect his culinary arts rather than by an Arrow, hence he uses it mostly for his cooking methods.

Production
Diamond Is Unbreakable is set in the fictional town of Morioh located in S-City, M-Prefecture, which is modeled after a specific area in Hirohiko Araki's hometown of Sendai, Miyagi Prefecture. The author said that the suspense and fear caused by the "unusual" and "mysterious" residents there were his inspiration. Although he originally intended for JoJo's Bizarre Adventure to be a "mythical" manga with superpowers and such, he enjoyed drawing the "feeling of everyday life" in Diamond Is Unbreakable. Because he wanted to create a "closed city," the Stands featured were not proactively attacking.

During Diamond Is Unbreakables serialization, Araki received feedback from readers who felt that enemies in the manga had gotten weak. Although he usually does not respond to reader opinions, he had heard similar comments from the editorial team and so made an exception by stating that "the weaknesses inside the hearts of people" are a thematic element of Part 4. He explained that sometimes he has a character's inner weaknesses drive them into a desperate situation, while other times he turns the weakness into something "dreadful" and bases a Stand off of it. Araki wrote that constantly having stronger and stronger enemies appear in a manga eventually leads you to "trying to think of the farthest edges of the universe", but in the real world, "true strength is found in not doing bad things. An enemy who does bad things is a person with an inner weakness."

With Part 4 of the series, Araki said that he moved away from "muscle men" as they fell out of popularity with his readers and he wanted to focus more on fashion. When designing his characters' outfits, Araki considers both everyday fashion and "cartoonish, bizarre clothing that would be impractical in real life." He also forgoes using specific color schemes for his characters and gives his readers different impressions through various color combinations. Araki said that while he drew several characters in Parts 1 through 3 naked to evoke Greek or Roman gods, he stopped doing it so much with Part 4 to be a "bit closer to home." Because he is the "friend next door" instead of being similar to a hero in a Greek myth like the protagonists of the previous parts, Araki cited Josuke Higashikata as his favorite character in Diamond Is Unbreakable. He cited Shigekiyo Yangu's Harvest as his favorite Stand from Part 4, because, although he finds his "flaws and trashiness adorable," the character picks up stuff off of the ground which is "pretty scary."

Despite the prevalent belief that the manga artist character Rohan Kishibe is believed to be Araki's self-insert, the author revealed that he did not model Rohan after himself, but is fascinated by him. He said that unlike Rohan, he values human life more than art.

Chapters
In the original volumization, chapters 437–439 are collected in volume 47, listed on the Golden Wind page.

Original volumization

2004 release

2016 release

English release

Related media

In 2000, it was announced that Otsuichi would be writing a novel based on Part 4. The novel proved difficult to complete; in Kono Mystery ga Sugoi 2004, Otsuichi claimed to have written over 2000 pages, but thrown them all out. Intent on writing a novel that lived up to the manga, it took him until 2007 before The Book: JoJo's Bizarre Adventure 4th Another Day was finally released on November 26. It is set after the events in the manga, and includes illustrations by Araki.

In 1997, Araki published the Weekly Shōnen Jump one-shot Thus Spoke Rohan Kishibe ~Episode 16.. Confessional~, starring Rohan after the events of Part 4. In 1999 he wrote the three-chapter story Dead Man's Questions in Allman magazine. Dead Man's Questions stars Yoshikage Kira, the main antagonist of Part 4. Both Thus Spoke Rohan Kishibe and Dead Man's Questions were later compiled in Araki's one-shot collection, Under Jailbreak, Under Execution, in 1999. The former launched a series starring Rohan, Thus Spoke Kishibe Rohan.

The issue of Jump Square for December 11, 2007, featured a second entry into the Thus Spoke Rohan Kishibe collection, entitled Thus Spoke Rohan Kishibe ~Mutsukabezaka~, set seven years after the events of Part IV. 

In 2009, Araki wrote the full-color story Rohan au Louvre. The short story was displayed at the Musée du Louvre as part of their 2009 Le Louvre invite la bande dessinée exhibit. The story was later republished in Ultra Jump in 2010. In 2012, Rohan au Louvre was released in English by NBM Publishing under the translated title Rohan at the Louvre.

In 2011, Araki collaborated with the renowned Italian fashion brand Gucci for the short story Rohan Kishibe Goes to Gucci in the women's fashion magazine Spur. 

In 2012, Araki wrote a third Thus Spoke Rohan Kishibe one-shot for Weekly Shōnen Jump. Entitled Thus Spoke Rohan Kishibe ~Episode 5: Millionaire Village~ it was released in the October 6, 2012 issue of the magazine.

In October 2015, Warner Bros. announced that Part 4 would receive an anime television adaptation that serves as a continuation of David Production's series adaptation. The series aired in 2016.

Toho and Warner Bros. partnered to produce a live-action film based on the fourth arc of JoJo's Bizarre Adventure that was released on August 4, 2017. Takashi Miike directed the film that stars Kento Yamazaki as Josuke. Both studios planned for worldwide distribution and, with a title of JoJo's Bizarre Adventure: Diamond Is Unbreakable Chapter I, hoped to create sequels. However, the film under-performed at the box office, leaving the possibility of future sequels in doubt.

JoJo's Bizarre Adventure: Crazy Diamond's Demonic Heartbreak, a spin-off manga set in Morioh, began serialization in the December 2021 issue of Shueisha's seinen manga magazine Ultra Jump on December 18, 2021. It is written by Kouhei Kadono and illustrated by Tasuku Karasuma.

The Cheap Trick story arc was adapted into the episode From Behind of the Thus Spoke Rohan Kishibe TV series released on December 28, 2021. The Janken Boy Is Coming! story arc was adapted into the episode Rock-Paper-Scissors Boy released on December 27, 2022.

Reception
In a 2018 survey of 17,000 JoJo's Bizarre Adventure fans, Diamond Is Unbreakable was chosen as the second favorite story arc with 17.5% of the vote.

Anime News Network had both Rebecca Silverman and Faye Hopper review the first volume of Diamond Is Unbreakable. Silverman called the beginning slower and not as instantly engrossing as the previous parts, but felt this allowed Josuke, whom she and Hopper both described as kinder than the previous protagonists, to develop as a character. Hopper stated that Diamond Is Unbreakable is sometimes criticized for a "lack of a strong narrative throughline" in comparison to other parts, but argued that this is one of its greatest strengths as it allows the main characters to "simply be, lending them an amiable humanity that none of the over-the-top archetypes in the first 3 Parts ever had."

Notes

References

JoJo's Bizarre Adventure
Adventure anime and manga
Fantasy anime and manga
Fiction about urban legends
Fiction set in 1999
Manga adapted into films
Sendai in fiction
Shōnen manga
Shueisha manga
Supernatural anime and manga
Viz Media manga
Works about fictional serial killers